Here is the tenth studio album by Scottish alternative rock band Teenage Fanclub, released on 9 September 2016 on the band's own PeMa label in Europe and on Merge Records in North America. It was the band's final album to feature bassist and co-founder Gerard Love, who left the band in November 2018.

Recording
Teenage Fanclub began recording Here in 2013 at Vega Studio in Provence in southeastern France. The studio was primarily chosen for its vintage EMI desk, which is said to have been used for recording two Rolling Stones albums. "We always like to go somewhere that's not Glasgow because I think your environment affects what you're doing while you're working," guitarist Norman Blake said in 2016. "If you go to an exotic location like the south of France, hopefully you feel a little more inspired." The band spent three weeks at the studio, completing most of the backing tracks during their stay. The band then went their separate ways for a few months, ruminating on what they had recorded so far. All vocals were then recorded at guitarist Raymond McGinley's home studio in Glasgow in two weeks spread over a couple of months, with the band's three songwriters taking turns putting down their lead and harmony vocals. "Because we write our lyrics while doing this," Blake said, "it's inevitable that we end up writing about similar things as you can't help but pick up on what the others are writing about."

The band worked on the album for three years intermittently between other projects, with Blake even recording some additional harmony vocals in a hotel room in Halifax, Nova Scotia in Canada when he was performing solo at the Halifax Urban Folk Festival. "I emailed those to Raymond and he dropped them into the song the same day," Blake said. Mixing of the album took three weeks in late 2015 at Clouds Hill Recordings in Hamburg, Germany. It was mastered at Abbey Road Studios in London, England. "Three years, four studios and four countries," as Blake put it.

Critical reception

Here received favorable reviews from music critics. At Metacritic, which assigns a normalized rating out of 100 to reviews from critics, the album received an average score of 79, which indicates "generally favourable reviews", based on 21 reviews.

The album made the twenty-strong longlist for the Scottish album of the Year Award 2017 but did not make it to the ten-strong shortlist.

Track listing

Personnel
Credits for Here are adapted from AllMusic and the album's liner notes.

Teenage Fanclub
Norman Blake
Gerard Love
Raymond McGinley
Francis Macdonald 
David McGowan

Additional musicians
John McCusker – viola, violin on "The Darkest Part of the Night"
Elspeth Mackay – cello on "The Darkest Part of the Night"
Robert Henderson – trumpet on "The First Sight"
Nigel Baillie 	– trumpet on "Live in the Moment"
Helen Thomson 	– harp on "Live in the Moment"

Technical
Teenage Fanclub – producer
David Henderson – engineer
Raymond McGinley – engineer
Bertrand Montandon – assistant engineer (Vega)
Quentin Tillie – assistant engineer (Vega)
Linda Gerdes – assistant engineer (Clouds Hills)
Sebastian Muxfeldt – assistant engineer (Clouds Hills)
Sean Magee – mastering
Krista Blake – sleeve design

References

Teenage Fanclub albums
2016 albums